Municipal elections were held in Milan on 28–29 May 2006, to elect the Mayor of Milan and the 60 members of the City Council.

The incumbent Mayor Gabriele Albertini was term-limited and could not run for a third term.

The main candidates were the incumbent Minister of Education Letizia Moratti, supported by Silvio Berlusconi's centre-right coalition House of Freedoms, and the former prefect of Milan Bruno Ferrante, supported by the centre-left coalition The Union.

As a result of the election, Letizia Moratti was officially proclaimed new Mayor of Milan on 1 June 2006, becoming the first female to fill the office.

Background

Centre-left primary election
In December 2005 the centre-left coalition decided to call an open primary election to choose its mayoral candidate.
Four people registered to be candidates in this election: Bruno Ferrante, former prefect of Milan (2000–2005); Dario Fo, playwright and 1997 Nobel Prize in Literature; Milly Moratti, environmentalist activist; and Dario Corritore, an independent business executive.

The election took place on 29 January 2006:

Total voters: 82,496

Voting System
The semipresidential voting system was the one used for all mayoral elections in Italy of cities with a population higher than 15,000 for the fourth time. Under this system voters express a direct choice for the Mayor or an indirect choice voting for the party of the candidate's coalition. If no candidate receives at least 50% of votes, the top two candidates go to a second round after two weeks. This gives a result whereby the winning candidate may be able to claim majority support.

The election of the City Council is based on a direct choice for the candidate with a preference vote: the candidate with the majority of the preferences is elected. The number of the seats for each losing party is determined proportionally.

Parties and candidates
This is a list of the major parties (and their respective leaders) which participated in the election.

Results

References

2006 elections in Italy
Milan
Milan
Elections in Milan
2000s in Milan
May 2006 events in Europe